Maheshwar Hazari (born 9 October 1962) is an Indian politician and currently the Deputy Speaker of Bihar Legislative Assembly. He has previously served as the Minister of Industry Department, Planning and Development Department in the state of Bihar. Prior to this he had charge of the Urban Development and Housing Department, in which he had done many works like Patna Metro and New Patna Map Plan. Later on, he got the charge of PWD (Building Construction Department). 

He won Kalyanpur (Samastipur) constituency by one of the highest margins of 52,000 votes, over a nephew of Ram Vilas Paswan. He is a former member of the Indian Parliament, and represented Samastipur (Lok Sabha constituency). He has fought 15th and 16th Loksabha. 
He was a three-time MLA in the Bihar Legislative Assembly. Hazari is a cousin of Ram Vilas Paswan. He defeated Ram Vilas's brother Ram Chandra Paswan. His father, Ramsewak Hazari, was socialist politician and was an eight-time MLA in the Bihar Assembly, and he was elected to sixth general election as an MP in Loksabha.

References

1972 births
Living people
India MPs 2009–2014
Lok Sabha members from Bihar
Bihar MLAs 2020–2025
Janata Dal (United) politicians
Lok Janshakti Party politicians